The Mizoram Legislative Assembly is the unicameral state legislature of Mizoram state in north-eastern India. The seat of the Legislative Assembly is at Aizawl, the capital of the state. The Legislative Assembly comprises 40 Members of the Legislative Assembly directly elected from single-seat constituencies.

History of the Mizoram Legislative Assembly constituencies
The history of the Mizoram Legislative Assembly constituencies can be traced to 1987, when the 51st Amendment to the Constitution of India provided for the first elected legislative assembly of the new State of Mizoram.

The first election to this Legislative Assembly was conducted in 1987.

List of constituencies
Following is the list of the constituencies of the Mizoram Legislative Assembly since the last delimitation of legislative assembly constituencies. As of 2008, 39 constituencies are reserved for the candidates belonging to the Scheduled Tribes :

References

Legislative Assembly
Mizoram